A.C. Milan got back to the level at which it had performed in consecutive seasons between 1992 and 1994, resulting in the domestic league title. It had reacted to its unexpected fall from grace in 1994-95 with signing George Weah and Roberto Baggio for the attack. Despite Baggio not performing at his customary Juventus level, a tight defence landed the title for the Milanese club.

Following the season, Fabio Capello eventually left the club in order to join Spanish La Liga giants Real Madrid as a new manager.

Squad

Transfers

Winter

Spring

Competitions

Serie A

League table

Results by round

Matches

Coppa Italia

Round of 32

Eightfinals

Quarterfinals

UEFA Cup

First round

Second round

Eightfinals

Quarterfinals

Statistics

Players statistics

Top scorers
  George Weah 11
  Marco Simone 8
  Roberto Baggio 7
  Dejan Savićević 6
  Christian Panucci 5
  Paolo Di Canio 5

References

Sources
  RSSSF - Italy 1995/96

A.C. Milan seasons
Milan
1996